The Mayor of Gisborne officiates over the Gisborne District of New Zealand's North Island.

Rehette Stoltz is the current mayor of Gisborne.

List of mayors of Gisborne

References

Gisborne
Politics of the Gisborne District
Gisborne District